Andy Larkin (born September 20, 1946) is an American rower. He competed in the men's coxed eight event at the 1968 Summer Olympics. He graduated from Harvard University and Harvard Medical School.

References

1946 births
Living people
American male rowers
Olympic rowers of the United States
Rowers at the 1968 Summer Olympics
Sportspeople from New Britain, Connecticut
Harvard Crimson rowers
Harvard Medical School alumni
Pan American Games medalists in rowing
Pan American Games gold medalists for the United States
Rowers at the 1967 Pan American Games